Images is an album by the Italian singer and songwriter Lucio Battisti. It was released in September 1977 by RCA Victor.

The album is a collection of five songs from his previous album, Io tu noi tutti, and two of his classic songs ("Il mio canto libero" and "La canzone del sole"). All of the songs were translated into English by Peter Powell.

Critical reception 
Stateside critics considered the record a relative failure: Richard Williams, inMelody Maker, wrote that it sounded akin to a "watered-down Battisti".

They mostly criticized Battisti's poor English skills, the flawed lyric translations and the disco-inspired arrangements (that, although pleasant, were not able to convey the spirit and the nuances of the original songs).

Track listing
All lyrics written by Mogol and Peter Powell, all music composed by Lucio Battisti.
 "To Feel in Love" – 5:09
 "A Song to Feel Alive" – 4:39
 "The Only Thing I've Lost" – 5:02
 "Keep on Cruising" – 4:36
 "The Sun Song" – 5:17
 "There's Never Been a Moment" – 4:47
 "Only" – 4:47

References 

1977 albums
Lucio Battisti albums
Albums produced by Bones Howe